Zabrus constrictus is a species of ground beetle in the Platyzabrus subgenus that is endemic to Spain.

References

Beetles described in 1858
Beetles of Europe
Endemic fauna of Spain
Zabrus